MRT 3 (МРТ 3) is a television channel in North Macedonia owned and operated by Macedonian Radio-Television. The channel primarily focuses on sports content and films.

History
In 2012, MRT3 was a test channel and broadcast with the Blizoo television service provider.

In May 2020, the Macedonian Radio Television launched 3 more channels, including MRT3 (sports channel), MRT4 (international channel) and MRT5 (kids channel). All TV service providers tuned to these new channels in late-May to mid-June.

References

External links
Macedonian Radio-Television

Television channels in North Macedonia
Television channels and stations established in 2014
Macedonian Radio Television